The Shahi Imam is the Imam of Delhi's Jama Masjid.

History
Mughal Emperor Shahjahan appointed Abdul Ghafoor Shah Bukhari, who originally came from Shah of Bukhara, Uzbekistan to be the first Imam of the Mosque in 1656.

Imams of Jama Masjid  
Shahi Imams of Jama Masjid include:
 Abdul Ghafoor Shah Bukhari (from 23 July 1656)
 Abdul Shakoor Shah Bukhari
 Abdul Raheem Shah Bukhari
 Abdul Ghafoor Shah Bukhari Thani
 Abdul Rehman Shah Bukhari
 Abdul Kareem Shah Bukhari
 Mir Jeewan Shah Bukhari
 Mir Ahmed Ali Shah Bukhari (until 16 October 1892)
 Mohammed Shah Bukhari (from 16 October 1892) 
 Ahmed Bukhari (until 20 February 1942)
 Hameed Bukhari (20 February 1942 – 8 July 1973)
 Abdullah Bukhari (8 July 1973 – 14 October 2000)
 Ahmed Bukhari I (14 October 2000 – present)

 Shaban Bukhari's formal designation as deputy Shahi Imam took place on 22 November 2014. His designation is intended to continue until his father Ahmed Bukhari decides to pass on the responsibility, as happened when his grandfather Abdullah Bukhari decided to pass on the responsibility to his father.

References

Indian imams
Mosques in Delhi